Adesola is a Nigerian name that may refer to

Given name
Adesola Kazeem Adeduntan (born 1969), Nigerian business executive
Adesola Nunayon Amosu (born 1958), Nigerian Nigerian Air Force Air vice-marshal
Adesola Osakalumi, American actor, dancer, choreographer

Surname
Adebola Adesola, Nigerian accountant
Akinpelu Oludele Adesola (1927–2010), Nigerian surgeon